Tandrevold is a Norwegian surname. Notable people with the surname include: 

Ingrid Landmark Tandrevold (born 1996), Norwegian biathlete
John Tandrevold (1927–2013), Norwegian boxer

Norwegian-language surnames